The Professor of Geometry at Gresham College, London, gives free educational lectures to the general public. The college was founded for this purpose in 1597, when it appointed seven professors; this has since increased to ten and in addition the college now has visiting professors.

The Professor of Geometry is always appointed by the City of London Corporation.

List of Gresham Professors of Geometry
Note, years given as, say, 1596/7 refer to Old Style and New Style dates.

References
Gresham College old website, Internet Archive List of professors
Gresham College website Profile of current professor and list of past professors

Notes

External links
 '400 Years of Geometry at Gresham College', lecture by Robin Wilson at Gresham College, 14 May 2008 (available for download as PDF, audio and video files)

Further reading
 

Geometry
1596 establishments in England
Professorships in mathematics
Mathematics education in the United Kingdom